Chinna may refer to:

 Earl "Chinna" Smith (born 1955), Jamaican guitarist
 Chinna, Dalmatia, an ancient Illyrian settlement
 Chinna (1994 film), a 1994 Kannada film
 Chinna (2005 film), a 2005 Tamil-language film
 Chinna (Telugu actor), Indian film actor
 Chinna (art director), art director in Indian cinema